Michel Zink (born 5 May 1945) is a French writer, medievalist, philologist, and professor of French literature, particularly that of the Middle Ages. He is the Permanent Secretary of the Académie des Inscriptions et Belles-Lettres, a title he has held since 2011, and was elected to the Académie française in 2017. In addition to his academic work, he has also written historical crime novels, one of which continues the story of Arsène Lupin.

Biography
Zink was born in Issy-les-Moulineaux near Paris to the poet  and Marthe Cohn. Historian Anne Zink and mathematician Odile Favaron are his sisters. He graduated from the École normale supérieure in 1968, and completed his doctoral thesis, Recherches sur les pastourelles médiévales, in 1970 under the direction of  while working as an assistant professor at Paris-Sorbonne University. Working with Le Gentil, Zink completed a second thesis, La Prédication en langue romane avant 1300 in 1975, and the following year became a full professor at the University of Toulouse-Le Mirail. He returned to the Sorbonne in 1987 as a professor, then moved to the Collège de France in 1994, where he became the chair of Literatures of Medieval France. The chair position was created specifically for Zink after having been vacant for twenty years. Zink left the Collège de France in 2016.

He was elected to the Académie des Inscriptions et Belles-Lettres in 2000, filling the vacant seat of medievalist . He was named chair of the board of directors of the École normale supérieure in 2004, resigning his seat the following year in protest of Monique Canto-Sperber becoming the head of the institution. He received a Balzan Prize in 2007. In 2017, Zink was elected to seat 37 of the Académie française, filling the vacancy left by the death of historian René Girard.

Honours and awards

Honours
 2021 : Grand Officier of the Legion of Honour
 2020 : Commander of the Ordre des Arts et des Lettres 
 2019 : Gold and Silver Star of the Order of the Rising Sun 
 2015 : Commander of the Order of Merit of the Italian Republic 
 2001 :  Commander of the Ordre des Palmes académiques

Awards
 2014 : Prix Provins-Moyen Âge
 2007 : Balzan Prize
 2001 : Medal of the Consistori del Gay Saber 
 1996 : Grand Gold Medal of the Arts-Sciences-Letters Society
 1987 : Prize of the International Association for French Studies

Honorary degrees
 2014 : University of Bucharest
 2004 : University of Sheffield

Works

Literary essays and critical editions 
 La Pastourelle : poésie et folklore au Moyen Âge, Paris, Bordas, coll. Études, 1972, 160 p.
 La Prédication en langue romane avant 1300, Paris, Champion, coll. Nouvelle Bibliothèque du Moyen Âge, 1976, 580 p.; 2e éd. revue, 1982.
 Belle : essai sur les chansons de toile, suivi d'une édition et d'une traduction, Paris, Champion, coll. Essais sur le Moyen Âge, 1978, 184 p.
 Roman rose et rose rouge : le Roman de la Rose ou de Guillaume de Dole de Jean Renart, Paris, Nizet, 1979, 127 p.
 Le Roman d’Apollonius de Tyr, édition, traduction et présentation, Paris, U.G.E. coll. 10/18. Série Bibliothèque médiévale , 1982, 315 p. ; puis nouvelle édition revue, Paris, LGF, coll. Le Livre de poche. Lettres gothiques , 2006, 285 p.
 La Subjectivité littéraire autour du siècle de saint Louis, Paris, PUF, coll. Écriture, 1985, 267 p.
 Rutebeuf, Œuvres complètes, texte établi, traduit, annoté et présenté avec variantes, Paris, Garnier, coll. Classiques Garnier, 1989–1990, 2 vol., 514 p. et 535 p. ; réédition dans une nouvelle édition revue et mise à jour, Paris, LGF, coll. Le Livre de poche. Lettres gothiques n° 4560, 2001, 1054 p.
 Le Moyen Âge : littérature française, coll. Phares, Presses Universitaires de Nancy, 1990, 167 p. réédition augmentée sous le titre Introduction à la littérature du Moyen-Âge, Paris, LGF, coll. Le Livre de poche. Références, 1993, 186 p. 
 Les Voix de la conscience : parole du poète et parole de Dieu dans la littérature médiévale, Caen, Paradigme, 1992, 418 p. [recueil d'articles].
 Littérature française au Moyen Âge, Paris, PUF, coll. Premier cycle, 1992, X-400 p.; 2e édition revue et mise à jour, 2001.
 Le Moyen Âge et ses chansons ou Un passé en trompe-l'œil, Paris, Éditions de Fallois, 1996, 231 p.
 Froissart et le temps, Paris, PUF, coll. Moyen Âge, 1998, 225 p.
 Le Jongleur de Notre-Dame : contes chrétiens du Moyen Âge, Paris, Le Seuil, 1999, 204 p.
 Déodat ou La transparence : un roman du Graal, Paris, Le Seuil, 2002, 153 p.
 Poésie et conversion au Moyen Âge, Paris, PUF, 2003, 346 p.
 Le Moyen Âge de Gaston Paris, Paris, Éditions Odile Jacob, 2004, 342 p.
 Le Moyen Âge à la lettre : abécédaire médiéval, Paris, Tallandier, 2004, 137 p.
 Livres anciens, lecture vivante, Paris, Éditions Odile Jacob, 2010, 352 p.
 D’autres langues que la mienne, Paris, Éditions Odile Jacob, 2014, 288 p.
 Bienvenue au Moyen Âge, Equateurs / France Inter, 2015, 184 p.
 L'Humiliation, le Moyen Âge et nous, Paris, Albin Michel, 2017, 261 p.

Novels 
 Le Tiers d'amour : un roman des troubadours, Paris, Éditions de Fallois, 1998, 205 p.
 Arsène Lupin et le mystère d’Arsonval, Paris, Éditions de Fallois, 2004, 153 p. ; réédition, Paris, LGF, coll. Le Livre de poche n° 35026, 2006 
 Un portefeuille toulousain, Paris, Éditions de Fallois, 2007, 153 p. ; réédition, Paris, LGF, coll. Le Livre de poche n° 31604, 2009 
 Bérets noirs, bérets rouges, Paris, Éditions de Fallois, 2018, 220 p.

Memoir 
 Seuls les enfants savent lire, Paris, Taillandier, 2009, 121 p. . Réédition : Paris, Les Belles Lettres, 2019, 150 p. .

Collaborations 
 Commentary on Girart de Roussillon ou L'épopée de Bourgogne, with M. Thomas, adaptation into modern French of R.-H. Guerrand, Paris, Philippe Lebaud, 1990.
 Histoire européenne du roman médiéval : esquisse et perspectives, with M. Stanesco, Paris, PUF, coll. Écriture, 1992, 218 p.
 Revised edition of Dictionnaire des lettres françaises. Le Moyen Âge with Geneviève Hasenohr, Paris, LGF, coll. Le Livre de poche. La Pochothèque, 1992 ; repr. 1994 , originally by Robert Bossuat, Louis Pichard and Guy Raynaud de Lage, Paris, 1939–64.
 L'Art d'aimer au Moyen Âge, with M. Cazenave, D. Poirion, and A. Strubel; Éditions du Félin, Ph. Lebaud, 1997, Un nouvel art d'aimer, p. 7-70.
 Pages manuscrites de la littérature médiévale, with Geneviève Hasenohr, Paris, LGF, coll. Le Livre de poche. Lettres gothiques, 1999, 95 p.
 L'Œuvre et son ombre : que peut la littérature secondaire ?, edited by Michel Zink, other contributions by Yves Bonnefoy, Pierre Bourdieu, Pascale Casanova, Antoine Compagnon, Michael Edwards, Marc Fumaroli, Michel Jarrety, Hubert Monteilhet, Carlo Ossola, Harald Weinrich, Paris, Éditions de Fallois, 2002, 154 p.
 Le Moyen Âge de Gaston Paris : la poésie à l'épreuve de la philologie, edited by Michel Zink, Paris, Éditions Odile Jacob, coll. Collège de France, 2004, 343 p.
 Naissance, Renaissances, Moyen Âge – XVI e siècle, with Frank Lestringant, Paris, PUF, 2006, 1063 p.
 Froissart dans sa forge, edited by Michel Zink, colloquium held in Paris, 4–6 November 2004, Paris, Académie des Inscriptions et Belles-Lettres – Collège de France, Éd. de Boccard, 2006, p. 5-6, 85-89 et 231–234. 
 Moyen Âge et Renaissance au Collège de France, with Pierre Toubert, Paris, Fayard, 2009, 665 p.

References

 

1945 births
Living people
École Normale Supérieure alumni
Members of the Académie Française
People from Issy-les-Moulineaux
Officiers of the Légion d'honneur
Recipients of the Order of Merit of the Italian Republic
French philologists
21st-century French writers
French medievalists
Academic staff of the University of Toulouse
Academic staff of the Collège de France